Molorchini is a tribe of beetles in the subfamily Cerambycinae, containing the following genera:

 Genus Afromolorchus Tippmann, 1959
 Genus Anencyrus Sharp, 1886
 Anencyrus discedens Sharp, 1886
 Genus Anomoderus Fairmaire, 1871
 Genus Berndgerdia Holzschuh, 1982
 Genus Brachaciptera Lea, 1917
 Genus Buddhapania Niisato, 2015
 Genus Epania Pascoe, 1858
 Genus Gastrosarus Bates, 1874
 Gastrosarus lautus Broun, 1893
 Gastrosarus nigricollis Bates, 1874
 Gastrosarus picticornis Broun, 1893
 Gastrosarus urbanus Broun, 1893
 Genus Laopania Holzschuh, 2010
 Genus Leptepania Heller, 1924
 Genus Malayanomolorchus Hayashi, 1979
 Genus Mecynopus Erichson, 1842
 Genus Merionoedina Villiers, 1968
 Genus Merionoedopsis Gounelle, 1911
 Merionoedopsis aeneiventris Gounelle, 1911
 Merionoedopsis brevipennis Melzer, 1934
 Genus Molochrus Heller, 1924
 Genus Molorchoepania Pic, 1949
 Genus Molorchus Fabricius, 1793Selected species:
 Molorchus bimaculatus Say, 1824
 Molorchus eburneus Linsley, 1931
 Molorchus longicollis LeConte, 1873
 Molorchus umbellatarum (Schreber, 1759)
 Genus Nadezhdiana Cherepanov, 1976
 Genus Nephithea Pascoe, 1867
 Genus Paranomoderus Breuning, 1954
 Genus Tsujius Ikeda, 2001

References

Cerambycinae